Traveler is the seventh studio album of Japanese singer Hitomi. The album was formally released on May 12, 2004 by the Avex Trax  label. This is the first album of Hitomi to be released in the CD+DVD format, which Avex first introduced to their artists in 2003.

Background
All lyrics on the album were written by Hitomi, and it features production of Zentaro Watanabe, Takamune Negishi and CMJK. In the album Hitomi tries many different music genres, from bossa nova to electronica.

The album had two promotional singles. "Hikari", which was used as theme song of the TBS TV show Koisuru Honey Coming and from the double A-side single "Kokoro no Tabibito/Speed Star", the first one was used as theme song of the Fuji TV drama Rikon Bengoshi, and the last in TV commercials of Toshiba cellphones A5504T.

Track listing

Charts and sales
Oricon sales charts (Japan)

References

2004 albums
Hitomi albums